Tape Club is a 26-song compilation of unreleased songs, B-sides, and demos from American indie pop/rock band Someone Still Loves You Boris Yeltsin. It was released in the United States in 2011.

Track listing

Personnel 
John Robert Cardwell, Philip Dickey, Jonathan James, Will Knauer

Additional musicians
2 = Additional guitar and bass by Chris Slater and Tom Hembree.
3 = Additional vocals by Gwyn Knauer.
5, 19 = Clarinet by Roni Dickey.
10 = Additional vocals by Grace Bentley.
18 = Additional shouting by Cindy Woolf, Matt Greene, Roni Dickey, Grace Bentley, Michael St. John, and Ryan Spilken.

Recording and production
All recorded by SSLYBY in Springfield, Missouri except where noted. Mastered by Jonathan James at a Motel 6.
1 = Phil's mom's house, winter 2002.
2, 4 = Sean Schultz's basement, winter 2003.
3 = Weller house, winter 2003.
5 = Fremont house, summer 2005.
6, 8 = Jonathan's studio/practice space, summer 2005.
7 = Lotus Rain's house, summer 2005.
9, 10 = Weller attic, summer 2005.
11, 12 = Jonathan's studio/practice space, winter 2007.
13 = Bentley's carriage house, fall 2007.
14 = Jonathan's studio/practice space, fall 2007.
15 = Fred Champion's loft in Wilmington, North Carolina, winter 2007.
16 = The Studio, spring 2008. Recorded by Lou Whitney and Eric Schuchmann.
17 = Phil's apartment, spring 2008.
18 = Mayor of Springfield's yoga studio/basement, summer 2009.
19, 20 = Will's house on Normal Street, summer 2009.
21, 22 = Phil's basement, summer 2009.
23 = Phil's room and Jonathan's apartment, summer 2009.
24, 26 = Smart Studios in Madison, Wisconsin, fall 2009. Recorded by Chris Walla and Beau Sorenson.
25 = Dark Egg studio, fall 2009.

Album art
Photos and art by Daniel Zender, Zoe Burnett, Gabriella Lacza, Abby Williamson, Tracy Graham, Jason Williamson, Tim Nowack, and Chris Beckman. Art direction by Chris Beckman.

References

Someone Still Loves You Boris Yeltsin albums
2011 compilation albums